The 2012 FIS Ski Jumping Grand Prix was the 19th Summer Grand Prix season in ski jumping on plastic for men and the 1st for ladies.

Mixed team was also introduced for the 1st time in history.

Season began on 20 July 2012 in Wisła, Poland and ends on 3 October 2012 in Klingenthal, Germany.

Other competitive circuits this season included the World Cup and Continental Cup.

Calendar

Men

Ladies

Mixed

Men's team

Men's standings

Overall

Nations Cup

Ladies' standings

Overall

Nations Cup

References

Grand Prix
FIS Grand Prix Ski Jumping